Midnight in the Garden of Good and Evil is a non-fiction novel by John Berendt. The book, Berendt's first, was published in 1994 and follows the story of an antiques dealer on trial for the murder of a male prostitute. Subtitled A Savannah Story, with an initial printing of 25,000 copies, the book became a New York Times Best-Seller for 216 weeks following its debut and remains one of the longest-standing New York Times Best-Sellers.

The book was adapted for Clint Eastwood's 1997 film, with several characters' names changed to protect their privacy.

Background
In tone, Midnight in the Garden of Good and Evil is atmospherically Deep South coastal (Savannah, Georgia, and Beaufort, South Carolina) and Southern Gothic, depicting a wide range of eccentric personalities in and around Savannah.

The central narrative concerns the  shooting of Danny Hansford, a local male prostitute (characterized as "a good time not yet had by all" by Prentiss Crowe, a Savannah socialite), by respected antiques dealer Jim Williams, who was also his employer. This resulted in four murder trials, with the fourth ending in acquittal after the judge finally agreed to a change of venue to move the case away from the Savannah jury pool. The book describes Williams' version of the killing, which is that it was in "self-defense"—the result of Hansford, who was prone to fits of rage, shooting at Williams with a gun that was on display, and Williams shooting back to protect himself—and not murder, pre-meditated or otherwise, by Williams. The death occurred in Williams'  Mercer House home, which is now a museum.

The book highlights many other notable Savannah residents, including The Lady Chablis, a local transgender woman, club performer, and entertainer. Chablis provides both a Greek chorus of sorts as well as a light-hearted contrast to the more serious action. Chablis was given a dedicated chapter, as was Emma Kelly, the "lady of 6,000 songs.”

Characters and events
The book's plot is based on real-life events that occurred in the 1980s and is classified as non-fiction. Because it reads like a novel (and rearranges the sequence of true events in time), it is sometimes referred to as a "non-fiction novel."

Although the book's timeline is set to coincide with the entire saga of Jim Williams' arrest and four trials for murder, in reality Berendt did not meet Williams for the first time until 1982 — after the millionaire had already been convicted of murder the first time and released pending appeal. Berendt also did not move to Savannah to collect material for his book until 1985 — after Williams' second conviction for the murder. Williams was a free man and living in Mercer House during Berendt's five years in Savannah.

"The only fictional character in the book is the narrator, me, until I catch up with myself midway through the book," Berendt said in 1995. "I felt that was a legitimate license to take. The book is 99 percent true and 1 percent exaggeration."

In the first chapter, Berendt and Williams are interrupted by Hansford's screaming entrance; this happened prior to their meeting. "Jim was having drinks with somebody else," explains Berendt. "Jim told me about it and so did somebody else. So I reconstructed it, put myself in there. The first evening in Mercer House is a combination of a lot of stories he told me. Then afterward, I meet all these people — Joe Odom, Chablis, Lee Adler. I met all these people, obviously, after the murder, but they don't impact the murder at all, so I simply put them right after my meeting with Jim, and it seems as though I met them before the shooting and I didn't, but so what? All of those meetings with people were actual meetings. They took place in '85 or later, and they are pretty much verbatim what happened with those people and me."

Nancy Hillis, who appears as Mandy Nichols, later explained that, contrary to Berendt's portrayal of her, she did not meet Joe Odom until he had moved from 16 East Jones Street to 101 East Oglethorpe Avenue, part of the John Hunter duplex. She also clarified that there was no romantic relationship between her and Odom, largely because Odom was gay. Odom died in 1991, over two years before the book was published, but this is not mentioned in its narrative.

The person represented by Serena Dawes (a composite character of Helen Avis Drexel) died in 1974, over twenty years before the book's release.

Minerva is based on root doctor Valerie Boles.

Title
The title alludes to the hoodoo notion of "midnight," the period between the time for good magic (11:30 P.M. to midnight) and the time for evil magic (midnight to 12:30 A.M.).

Although Bonaventure Cemetery is the focus in the book, "the garden of good and evil" refers principally to the cemetery in Beaufort, South Carolina, where Dr. Louis Buzzard, the husband of Minerva, the folk-magic practitioner who figures in the story, is buried. It is over his grave that Minerva performed the incantations to ensure a more successful result in the retrial for the case of Jim Williams. (The marriage between Minerva and Dr. Buzzard was the invention of John Berendt. Dr. Buzzard was based on Stephen Robinson, who died in 1947, aged 86.)

Cover
The Bird Girl statue, designed both as art and as a birdseed holder, was originally located at Savannah's historic Bonaventure Cemetery. A Savannah photographer, Jack Leigh, was commissioned to take a photograph for the cover of the book. The cover image became immediately iconic, with author John Berendt calling it "one of the strongest covers I've ever seen", and the statue became a popular stop for tourists. Owing to rising concerns about the integrity of the statue and the cemetery's privacy, Bird Girl was relocated in 1997 for display in Telfair Museums in Savannah.

Legacy
In 1993, the year before the book's publication, Savannah had five million visitors, who spent almost $600 million during their time in the city. Two years after the book's release, Savannah was seeing a 46% increase in tourism. Twenty years later, the number of visitors to the city had jumped to 12.5 million, spending $2.2 billion.

Awards
The book won the 1995 Boeke Prize and was one of the finalists for the 1995 Pulitzer Prize for non-fiction.

References

External links

 
 
 

1994 American novels
American novels adapted into films
Lambda Literary Award-winning works
Non-fiction novels about murders in the United States
Novels set in Savannah, Georgia
Random House books
Southern Gothic novels
Transgender non-fiction books
1994 debut novels

th:บาปฆาตกร